A clean driving zone is an area designed and specifically dedicated within a manufacturing or production facility, or any industrial plant, which assists with the cleaning of lift truck tires as well as other wheels from intra-logistic transport vehicles. CDZ's are currently installed mostly at automotive OEMs and their tier 1 and 2 supplier networks. In recent years, more industries have adopted a process to assist with "Clean Factory Solutions" and achieve a higher standard of technical cleanliness. Food and beverage manufacturers have also started to implement clean driving zones at their sites to assist with disinfecting wheels to prevent contamination or cross-contamination.

References

Freight transport